Jean-Christophe Novelli    (born 22 February 1961) is a French celebrity chef.

Early life

Novelli was born in Arras, in the Pas-de-Calais department in northern France, in 1961. He left school at 14 and worked in a bakery before, at the age of 20, becoming a personal chef to the Rothschild family.

Career

Novelli moved to Britain in 1983, working in several establishments including the Chewton Glen Hotel in New Milton, Hampshire, later running Keith Floyd's Maltster's Arms restaurant in Totnes, Devon. He won the first of four Michelin stars as Chef Patron at Gordleton Mill in Lymington, Hampshire and was awarded Best Outstanding Dessert by Egon Ronay before becoming head chef at the Four Seasons Hotel on Hyde Park Corner, London. In 1996 he founded his restaurant, Maison Novelli, in Clerkenwell, London. He opened further restaurants in London, France and South Africa. Novelli also expanded into the gastro-pub market, his first being The White Horse in Harpenden.  In 2005 Jean-Christophe launched the Novelli Academy Cookery School based at his home in Hertfordshire.  He opened his first of many brasserie concept restaurants in the Double Tree Hilton Hotel in Liverpool but withdrew the brand after a mutual decision between the brand and the owner in January 2016.  In 2018 he opened 'Novelli at City Quays' in the new AC Marriott hotel in the City Quays, Belfast, Northern Ireland.

In 2013 Novelli launched recipe book, "Simply Novelli". In it he aimed to eliminate the myth that French cuisine is difficult and time-consuming to prepare.

Novelli Restaurants Limited

In 2016 The Novelli Restaurant Limited brand was created and the Restaurant Team devised three offerings mainly aimed at quality hotels. Terrané by Jean-Christophe Novelli - Brasseries, Bistro '61 by Jean-Christophe Novelli - Bistro style and Rapido by JCN Short menu concept and will be developing a further fine dining offering in the near future.  In 2018 Novelli announced the opening of his restaurant in the first Marriot hotel in Northern Ireland

Accolades

Jean-Christophe Novelli is a 5/5 AA Rosette and multi Michelin Star award-winning chef who has also been dubbed "The Nation’s Favourite French Chef", European Chef of Year finalist representing Great Britain, recipient of the prestigious Egon Ronay Dessert of the Year award. Voted the AA's Chef's Chef of the Year by his peers. His Novelli Academy has been voted one of the Top 25 Cooking Academies in the World, which he still owns and where he regularly hosts classes and performs his own cookery demonstrations.

On 5 September 2007 Novelli was awarded an Honorary Doctor of Arts from the University of Bedfordshire.

In March 2021, Novelli was awarded an honorary MBE by Her Majesty the Queen in recognition of his many acts of "voluntary and charitable service".

TV appearances

He appeared in the first series of The Games in 2003.

In 2005 Jean-Christophe became one of two Head Chefs in the second series of Hell's Kitchen with Gary Rhodes. In 2006, Novelli appeared on The X Factor: Battle of the Stars, performing in a group with fellow chefs Aldo Zilli, Paul Rankin and Ross Burden.

He has been a contestant on Family Fortunes with his fiancée Michelle Kennedy and on 2 May 2007 appeared on The Apprentice: You're Fired! on BBC Two, the show following The Apprentice on BBC One.

2009 saw Jean-Christophe presenting his own show for Bravo TV (USA) called Chef Academy where he tried to train 9 aspiring chefs into professionals over a 10-part series (originally planned for 6 episodes).

In October 2010, he teamed up with the Potato Council for a nationwide competition called Master Spud which gave the winner a chance to star alongside him in a national TV advert. In 2012 Jean-Christophe was a judge on Britain's Best Chef (ITV).

In 2014 Novelli appeared on ITV's This Morning, ITV Loose Women. and the last Alan Titchmarsh Show on ITV. He later appeared on the Britain's Got More Talent on ITV2 in 2015.

Jean-Christophe performs many demonstrations around Europe, Russia and may parts of the World including Taste of Dubai and South Africa passing on his passion for cooking and trying to teach people to cook more healthily using little saturated fats, low sugars and no salt.

In late 2015 Jean-Christophe featured in BBC One's A Question of Sport helping the mystery guest cook in his academy.

January 2016 saw a lengthy appearance of Jean-Christophe showing the uses and benefits of Rape Seed Oil on the very popular BBC1 show, Countryfile.

He was also a member of the celebrity audience in Derren Brown's TV special "The Gathering".

In 2017, he was the judge for week four of the ITV show Culinary Genius.

In 2019, he, with his partner chef Aldo Zilli, won the third season of the Channel 4 show Celebrity Hunted.

In February 2021, Jean-Christophe cooked live on Steph's Packed Lunch on C4 and, with the help of his sons Jean and Jacques, he made pancakes on Jeremy Vine on 5.   Jean-Christophe also prepared 2 of his favourite classics - Mussels and Tarte Tatin - for Raymond Blanc when he appeared as his guest chef in Episodes 4 & 8 of Simply Raymond Blanc on ITV (February and March 2021).

The Novelli Academy

In 2005 Jean-Christophe Novelli opened the Novelli Academy  which is based in his 14th-century home in Hertfordshire. Novelli continues to host public, private and virtual masterclasses and corporate team-bonding events.  During sessions in the Academy, Novelli promotes healthy cooking by replacing salt and sugar with his own unique flavours and reducing the amount of saturated fats.

Personal life

Novelli has been divorced twice. His first wife, Tina, was of English descent; he has a daughter from his first marriage, Christina Novelli (born 1986), who is a musician and songwriter. He married his second wife, Anzelle Visser, from Stellenbosch in South Africa, in 1999. At the time she was a model and also worked at Maison Novelli. They divorced in 2005. Novelli got engaged in November 2007 to his girlfriend of 2 years, Michelle Kennedy. On 29 August 2008, Kennedy gave birth to a son in Los Angeles. In July 2012, Kennedy gave birth to another son (Jacques) in St Johann in Pongau, Austria. They have a third son called Valentino who was born in 2016.

References

http://www.thefranceshow.com/foodandwine-details.aspx?id=180
http://www.jeanchristophenovelli.com

External links

Saturday Cooks! at itv.com
William Sitwell: Jean-Christophe Novelli – Renaissance Man
Pierre Koffmann
Novelli recipes

1961 births
Living people
People from Arras
French people of Italian descent
French chefs
French emigrants to England
The X Factor (British TV series) contestants
French restaurateurs
British restaurateurs
Head chefs of Michelin starred restaurants